2008 in professional wrestling describes the year's events in the world of professional wrestling.

List of notable promotions 
These promotions held notable shows in 2008.

Calendar of notable shows

January

February

March

April

May

June

July

August

September

October

November

December

Accomplishments and tournaments

AAA

AAA Hall of Fame

Ring of Honor

TNA

WWE

WWE Hall of Fame

Slammy Awards

Title changes

AAA

NJPW

ROH

TNA

WWE 
 – Raw
 – SmackDown
 - ECW

Raw and SmackDown each had a world championship, a secondary championship, a women's championship, and a male tag team championship. ECW only had a world championship.

Awards and honors

Pro Wrestling Illustrated

Wrestling Observer Newsletter

Wrestling Observer Newsletter Hall of Fame

Wrestling Observer Newsletter awards

Debuts
 January 3 – Ryuichi Sekine
 March 11 – Shinya Ishikawa
 April 19 – Shota
 April 26 - Adam Cole
 May 24 - Adam Page
 September 20 – Nikki Cross
 November 11 – Yumehito Imanari
 November 15 - Bo Dallas
 November 22 – Rusev
 December 4 – Ryuichi Kawakami

Retirements
 Roadkill (1996 – February 4, 2008) (brief return only in 2012)
 Billy Kidman (September 11, 1994 – February 23, 2008)
 Woody Farmer (1960s-April 12, 2008) 
 Torrie Wilson (February 21, 1999 – May 8, 2008) (brief return only in 2009 and 2018)
 Jonathan Coachman (December 23, 1999 – June 2008)
 Danny Basham (1998–July 5, 2008)
 Ashley Massaro (June 27, 2005 – July 9, 2008)
 Carlos Colón (February 16, 1966 – July 19, 2008)
 Johnny Jeter (September 2001 – August 2008) (brief return only in 2014)
 Cherry (January 1999 – August 15, 2008)
 Sonny Siaki (March 1998 – September 17, 2008)
 Joey Mercury (October 12, 1996 – October 2008) (returned to wrestling from 2010 onwards)
 Peter Thornley (1964-October 29, 2008) 
 KC James (December 15, 2001 – December 12, 2008)
 Misae Genki (August 28, 1994 – December 31, 2008)

Deaths

January 17 - Ernie Holmes, 59 
 February 15 – Johnny Weaver, 72
 March 6 – Don Curtis, 80
 March 16 – Gary Hart, 66
 March 20 – Bestia Salvaje, 46
 March 23 – Chase Tatum, 34
March 23 - Luis Magana, 97
 March 28 – Ron Slinker, 62
 April 5 - Buffalo Jim Barrier, 55
 May 11 – Judy Grable, 72
 May 12 – Penny Banner, 73
 May 25 - Rudy Kay, 65
 June 17 - Jimmy Jackson (wrestler), 51
 July 12 - Evgeny Artyukhin Sr., 59
 July 30  – Alfonso Dantés, 65
 August 20 - Sonny Fargo, 80
 August 30 – Killer Kowalski, 81
 September 21 - Al Hobman, 83 
 October 8 - Hogan Wharton, 72
 October 16 – Jack Reynolds, 71
 October 19 – Lia Maivia, 81
 October 26 – S. D. Jones, 63
 December 4 – Steve Bradley, 32 
 December 14 – Mike Bell, 37

See also
List of NJPW pay-per-view events
List of ROH pay-per-view events
List of TNA pay-per-view events
List of WWE pay-per-view events

References

 
professional wrestling